Lake City-Columbia County Historical Museum is a living history museum at the May Vinzant Perkins House in Lake City, Florida.

History

The Lake City-Columbia County Historical Museum is located in the Vinzant House. The house was built in the 1880s and purchased by John Vinzant Jr. for $450. Vinzant had come to Lake City after serving in the American Civil War as a sergeant in the 1st Florida Cavalry. Vinzant was the Columbia County Clerk of the Circuit Court and County Tax Collector. Vinzant also contributed to the Florida Agricultural College Fund when it was established about 1 mile south from the house in 1888. Vinzant was married to Mattie Vinzant and had three daughters: Cronin Ives, Birdie Livingston and May Perkins. John Vinzant died in 1907. Vinzant's youngest daughter May Perkins was married to Herbert Perkins and moved away to Washington, D.C. In 1912 May Perkins had a son but he died in infancy and then her husband died shortly afterwards. May Perkins returned to her father's house in Lake City. May Perkins' mother Mattied died in 1926 leaving her to live alone at the house until her death in 1981 at 102 years old. Perkins became a notable Lake City poet and historian. Since the death of Perkins in 1981 the house is still called the May Vinzant Perkins house. 

The Historic Preservation Board of Lake City and Columbia County jointly bought the house with the Blue-Grey Army, Inc. in 1983. The two groups wanted to restore the house and make it a historical and cultural center as well as a museum. The house was renovated in 1984 by the Blue-Grey Army to turn the May Vinzant Perkins house into a museum as well as to save the house from being demolished since it was in poor condition. In 2000 a plaque was placed on the front of the house commemorating May Vinzant Perkins as a notable Floridian.

Lake City holds an annual Battle of Olustee festival in downtown. Events are held at the Lake City-Columbia County Museum related to civil war history such as caring for wounded civil war soldiers or performing plays in relation to the civil war. Due to the COVID-19 pandemic the museum had to close from March to the second week of May 2020.

Blue-Grey Army
The Blue-Grey Army is an organization that has collected civil war artifacts and annually sponsors the Battle of Olustee Festival in Lake City. The organization jointly bought the Vinzant house with the Lake City Columbia County Historical Society. A room in the museum holds the Blue-Grey Army's civil war artifacts and is called the Blue-Grey Army room.

Gallery

References 

1984 establishments in Florida
Lake City, Florida
Buildings and structures in Columbia County, Florida
Tourist attractions in Columbia County, Florida
Historic house museums in Florida
Museums established in 1984
Houses completed in the 19th century